John Keenan (1864 – 19 March 1906) was an English professional footballer who played as a wing half. A strong, powerful half-back, Jack Keenan came to Burnley from Clitheroe, his home-town club, in 1884 and quickly established himself in a team consisting almost entirely of Scots. Keenan was a regular in his early days at Turf Moor and his consistency brought him to the fringe of international honours.

1888-1889
Jack Keenan made his League debut on 8 September 1888, playing at wing-half, at Deepdale, home of Preston North End who defeated Burnley 5–2. Jack Keenan played in 20 of the 22 League matches played by Burnley in season 1888–89. As a wing-half he played in a Burnley midfield that achieved big (three-League-goals-or-more) wins on two separate occasions.

References

1864 births
1906 deaths
People from Clitheroe
English footballers
Association football defenders
Clitheroe F.C. players
Burnley F.C. players
English Football League players